The VIVA Awards are $15,000 prizes, granted annually to British Columbian mid-career artists chosen for "outstanding achievement and commitment" by the Jack and Doris Shadbolt Foundation. The awards are presented by the Shadbolt Foundation in conjunction with the Alvin Balkind Curator's Prize and the Max Wyman Award for Critical Writing.

Award winners 
 1988 Stan Douglas, Carel Moiseiwitsch
 1989 Carole Itter, Neil Wedman
 1990 Terry Ewasiuk, David Ostrem
 1991 Persimmon Blackbridge, Gary Pearson
 1992 Award of Honour Alvin Balkind
 1993 Elspeth Pratt, Henry Tsang
 1994 Mike MacDonald, Chick Rice
 1995 Kati Campbell, Alan Storey
 1996 Lorna Brown, Phillipe Raphanel
 1997 Award of Honour Joan Lowndes, Ian Wallace
 1998 Cornelia Wyngaarden, Lawrence Paul Yuxweluptun
 1999 Myfanwy MacLeod, Judy Radul
 2000 Haruko Okano, Jerry Pethick
 2001 Dana Claxton, Brian Jungen
 2002 Award of Honour Jeff Wall
 2003 Geoffrey Farmer, Kelly Wood
 2004 Rebecca Belmore, Ron Terada
 2005 Hadley+Maxwell, Stephen Shearer
 2006 Damian Moppett, Marianne Nicolson
 2007 Luanne Martineau, Isabelle Pauwels
 2008 Tim Lee, Kevin Schmidt
 2009 Kathy Slade, Mark Soo
 2010 Germaine Koh, Marina Roy
 2011 Reece Terris, Althea Thauberger
 2012 Beau Dick, Ron Tran
 2013 Elizabeth McIntosh
 2014 Skeena Reece, Mina Totino
 2015 Elizabeth Zvonar
 2016 Kelly Lycan, Raymond Boisjoly
 2017 Lyse Lemieux
 2018 Hannah Jickling and Helen Reed, Charlene Vickers
2019 Krista Belle Stewart
2020 Lucie Chan, Cindy Mochizuki, Tania Willard
2021 Diyan Achjadi, Samuel Roy-Bois

References 

Canadian art awards